Simon de Montfort, 6th Earl of Leicester (c. 1208 – 1265), known as Simon V or VI de Montfort, was an Anglo-French nobleman who led the rebellion against King Henry III.

Simon de Montfort may also refer to:
Simon I de Montfort (c. 1025 – 1087), Lord of Montfort l'Amaury
Simon II de Montfort (c. 1068 – 1104), Lord of Montfort l'Amaury, son of Simon I
Simon III de Montfort (1117–1181), Count of Évreux and Lord of Montfort l'Amaury, nephew of Simon II
Simon de Montfort (died 1188) or Simon IV de Montfort, Lord of Montfort l'Amaury, son of Simon III
Simon de Montfort, 5th Earl of Leicester or Simon IV or V de Montfort or Simon de Montfort the Elder (c. 1175 – 1218), figures in the Fourth Crusade and the Albigensian Crusade
Simon de Montfort the Younger (1240–1271), second son of the 6th Earl

See also
Simon de Montford, English nobleman executed in 1495, unrelated to the above